Joachim Mununga (born 30 June 1988 in Ottignies) is a retired football player who last played for Viterbese. Currently he is assistant coach at OH Leuven. Born in Belgium, he represented the Democratic Republic of the Congo national football team.

Career
Mununga promoted with AFC Tubize to the highest level of Belgian football in 2008. He decided however to leave the team and to sign for KV Mechelen, as a lot of other players left Tubize.

In January 2011, he left KV Mechelen for Gençlerbirliği SK, but returned to Belgium in 2012 to play for Beerschot AC

Position
Mununga can play as well as striker as midfielder.

References

External links
 
 Joachim Mununga player info at sporza.be 
 
 NFT Profile

1988 births
Living people
People from Ottignies-Louvain-la-Neuve
Democratic Republic of the Congo footballers
Democratic Republic of the Congo football managers
Democratic Republic of the Congo international footballers
Belgian footballers
Belgian football managers
Belgium youth international footballers
Belgian people of Democratic Republic of the Congo descent
Democratic Republic of the Congo expatriate footballers
Belgian expatriate footballers
Belgian Pro League players
Challenger Pro League players
Süper Lig players
Israeli Premier League players
Association football midfielders
Association football forwards
Standard Liège players
Royal Excel Mouscron players
A.F.C. Tubize players
K.V. Mechelen players
Gençlerbirliği S.K. footballers
Beerschot A.C. players
R.A.E.C. Mons players
Maccabi Petah Tikva F.C. players
U.S. Viterbese 1908 players
Expatriate footballers in Turkey
Expatriate footballers in Israel
Expatriate footballers in Italy
Serie C players
Oud-Heverlee Leuven non-playing staff
Footballers from Walloon Brabant